The North Macedonia ambassador in Washington, D.C. is the official representative of the Government of North Macedonia to the Government of the United States.  

The United States formally recognized North Macedonia in 1994, with full diplomatic relations established in 1995. The embassy was formed and the first ambassador sent to the U.S. in the same year, as the administration of Bill Clinton recognized the government of Prime Minister Branko Crvenkovski in Skopje (North Macedonia).

List of representatives

References 

 
United States
North Macedonia